Timmy is a short film co-produced between Bulgaria, Germany and Belgium starring Silvia Petkova, Konstantin Gerginov-Timmy and Stoyan Tsvetkov written and directed by Lyubo Yonchev. Timmy was premiered in Academy-qualified festival IN THE PALACE International Short FIlm Festival, selected in more than 20 international film festivals.

Synopsis
When an alienated mother returns to Bulgaria to abduct her own 12-year-old son, she learns that it is not always easy to avoid making the same mistakes. She is determined not to leave her son again.

Release
 15th IN THE PALACE International Short Film Festival 2018
 24th Drama International Short Film Festival 2018
 30th Foyle Film Festival 2018
 19th International Izmir Short Film Festival 2018
 11th Jaipur International Film Festival

External links
 
 

2018 films
Bulgarian short films
German drama short films
Belgian short films
Bulgarian drama films
2010s Bulgarian-language films
Belgian drama films
2018 drama films
2010s German films